The Battle of Leça was a military encounter between a 6,800-man Portuguese force led by João Ramalho and Pedro, Count of Trastámara, a Castillian noble who was on the side of Portugal, and the smaller Castilian contingent led by the Archbishop of Santiago sent by John I of Castile to conquer Porto. The Portuguese forces, although smaller at the start, received significant reinforcements from Lisbon (that was also under siege at the time) just before the battle. The Portuguese attacked the Castilians who withdrew and were chased. Thus the Castilian blockade of Porto was finished.

Notes

References
Luís Miguel Duarte, Batalhas da História de Portugal - Guerra pela Independência, Academia Portuguesa de História, Lisboa, 2006, Vol. IV, pp 94, 95, 96

1384 in Europe
Leca 1384
Leca 1384
Conflicts in 1384
Leça